Darker: Fifty Shades Darker As Told by Christian, also referred to as Darker, is a 2017 erotic romance by British author, E. L. James. It is the fifth installment in the Fifty Shades novel series. The books were originally told by Anastasia Steele, the main protagonist, whereas Darker: Fifty Shades Darker as Told by Christian is told from the male character's point of view of the events of the second installment, Fifty Shades Darker.

The novel was released on 28 November 2017.

Summary
After breaking up in Fifty Shades of Grey, billionaire Christian Grey attempts to win back his lover, Anastasia Steele, after he punished her. Initially reluctant to resume the relationship, she only agrees under her own terms. As their relationship progresses, Christian's past and Anastasia's boss, Jack Hyde, threaten the couple.

Development
James announced that she was in the process of writing the novel on 10 September 2016.

Reception 
The Guardian considered the book to be No. 1 on the Top 50 Bestselling Books in the United Kingdom, selling more than 300 000 copies in its first week on sale.

References

2017 British novels
British erotic novels
British romance novels
Fifty Shades novels
Novels set in Seattle
Women's erotica and pornography
Works based on Twilight (novel series)
Novels set in Washington (state)
Vintage Books books